Make Alotta Money is a mixtape by American rapper Apathy. It was the first EP he had ever released, and it was officially released on October 8, 2010. It features the song of the same name as the EP with four different versions of it, along with two different versions of "We're Gonna Kill You". The Mixtape is produced by Apathy.

Track listing

References

Demigodz Records albums
Apathy (rapper) albums
2010 EPs